Kevin Parker may refer to:

 Kevin Parker (Australian footballer, born 1943), Australian footballer for South Melbourne
 Kevin Parker (Australian footballer, born 1945), Australian footballer for Fitzroy
 Kevin Parker (English footballer) (born 1979), English former footballer
 Kevin Parker (New York politician) (born 1967), New York State Senator
 Kevin Parker (Washington politician) (born 1973), member of the Washington House of Representatives
 Kevin Parker (musician) (born 1986), singer and guitarist of the Australian psychedelic rock band Tame Impala
 Kevin Kit Parker, United States Army officer and professor at Harvard University